German submarine U-52 was a type VIIB U-boat of Nazi Germany's Kriegsmarine during World War II. She was initially ordered on 15 May 1937, in violation of the terms of the Treaty of Versailles, and laid down on 9 March 1938, at the yards of Friedrich Krupp Germaniawerft AG in Kiel as yard number 587. Launched on 21 December 1938, she was commissioned on 4 February 1939, under the command of Kapitänleutnant (Kptlt.) Wolfgang Barten.

U-52 was attacked by an American warship, USS Niblack (DD-424), on 10 April 1941. She undertook eight war patrols in the Battle of the Atlantic, she sank thirteen ships before being scuttled at Danzig in 1945 and broken up in 1947.

Design
German Type VIIB submarines were preceded by the shorter Type VIIA submarines. U-52 had a displacement of  when at the surface and  while submerged. She had two shafts and two  propellers.

U-52 was fitted with five  torpedo tubes (four fitted at the bow and one at the stern), fourteen torpedoes, one  SK C/35 naval gun, 220 rounds, and one  anti-aircraft gun The boat had a complement of between forty-four and sixty.

Service history

First patrol
U-52s first patrol began with her departure from Kiel on 19 August 1939, well before the outbreak of war. She crossed the North Sea and headed for the Atlantic Ocean via the 'gap' between Iceland and the Faroe Islands. The most southerly point of the patrol was reached on 1 September, the same day that Germany began the invasion of Poland.

Second patrol
After a series of short trips from Kiel to the German-administered island of Helgoland, (also known as Heligoland) and then Wilhelmshaven, the boat left Helgoland on 27 February 1940 and arrived at Wilhelmshaven on 4 April.

Third patrol
Three days later, U-52 began her third sortie. It was very similar to her second; but success continued to elude her. She crossed the North Sea and swept the area between the Faroes and Shetland Islands.

Fourth patrol
Moving further into the Bay, U-52 came across the Ville de Namur. At first the Germans were under the impression that large wooden structures on deck were for weapons, when they were stables for horses. Nevertheless, the vessel was sunk; she went down in five minutes.

She also sank the Hilda on 21 June and the Thetis A. on 14 July. The latter vessel had already been attacked, but the torpedo used malfunctioned, (a common occurrence in the early months of the war).

Fifth patrol

On about the same day the submarine was badly damaged by British escorts; repairs took four months to implement.

Sixth patrol
Her tally rose steadily with the demise of the Tasso and the Goodleigh on the same day (2 December 1940).

Seventh patrol
There were no survivors from the second ship.

Eighth patrol
She sank the Saleier on 10 April 1941. The ship sank in 15 seconds but the whole crew of 63 survived.

Summary of raiding history

References

Bibliography

External links

1938 ships
German Type VIIB submarines
Ships built in Kiel
U-boats commissioned in 1939
World War II submarines of Germany
Operation Regenbogen (U-boat)
Maritime incidents in May 1945